Frederick Magnus, Count of Erbach-Fürstenau (18 April 1575 – 26 March 1618), was a German prince member of the House of Erbach and ruler over Fürstenau and Reichenberg.

Born in Erbach, he was the third child and second (but eldest surviving) son of George III, Count of Erbach-Breuberg and his second wife Anna, a daughter of Frederick Magnus, Count of Solms-Laubach-Sonnenwalde. He was named after his maternal grandfather.

Life

After the death of their father, Frederick Magnus and his surviving brothers divided the Erbach domains in 1606: he received the districts of Fürstenau and Reichenberg.

Frederick Magnus died in Reichenberg aged 42 and was buried in Michelstadt. Because he died without surviving male issue, his brothers divided his domains between them.

References

Counts of Germany
House of Erbach
1575 births
1618 deaths
17th-century German people